Saperion is an extinct genus of trilobite-like arthropod. It lived during the late Atdabanian stage, which lasted from 521 to 514 million years ago during the early part of the Cambrian Period. It was found in the Maotianshan Shales Saperion reached 151 mm in length and had nearly 25 pairs of limbs for walking.

References

Cambrian trilobites